The Cleveland Stars was a Negro league baseball team in the East-West League, based in Cleveland, Ohio, in 1932. In their only season, they finished with an 8-16 record.

References

African-American history in Cleveland
Negro league baseball teams
Stars
Defunct baseball teams in Ohio
Baseball teams disestablished in 1932
Baseball teams established in 1932